John Stuart Wilson (22 January 1932 – 2 July 2012) was an English-born Scottish first-class cricketer.

Wilson was born in January 1932 at Middleton, Lancashire. He moved to Scotland as a child, where he was educated at Brechin High School. A club cricketer for both Brechin and Forfarshire Cricket Club's, he made his debut for Scotland in first-class cricket against Lancashire at Old Trafford during Scotland's 1957 tour of England. He was a regular member of the Scottish team in the late 1950s and early 1960s, making sixteen first-class appearances to 1964. Playing in the Scottish side as a right-arm fast-medium bowler, he took 44 wickets in his sixteen matches at an average of 25.20; he took one five wicket haul, with figures of 5 for 51 against the Marylebone Cricket Club in 1959. A further performance of note with the ball came in 1962 against Ireland, when his four wickets in each innings helped guide Scotland to a 5 wicket victory. As a tailend batsman, he scored 66 runs at a low batting average of 5.07. Outside of cricket, Wilson was by profession a plumber. He died at Perth in July 2012.

References

External links
 

1932 births
2012 deaths
People from Middleton, Greater Manchester
Scottish people of English descent
People educated at Brechin High School
Scottish cricketers
British plumbers